The Western Main Road is the main road in Trinidad and Tobago that runs west from Green Corner in downtown Port of Spain, through St. James, where it is the main thoroughfare, til the Military Base in Chaguaramas.  

It is most notable as the scene of the Hosay which his held annually in May or June.

References

Roads in Trinidad and Tobago